Laila Taher Bugaighis is a Libyan physician and human rights activist.

She is the CEO and former deputy director general of the Benghazi Medical Centre, one of only two tertiary care hospitals in Libya. She is the founder and chair of the National Protection Against Violence Committee, a part of the National Transitional Council's Health Ministry. Bugaighis is also a member of the Scientific Committee for Reproductive Health of Libya, and co-founder of the political NGO Al Tawafuk Al Watani Democratic Organization.

Biography
Bugaighis studied medicine at Benghazi University. She is a consultant obstetrician and gynecologist, and a member of the Royal College of Obstetricians and Gynaecologists.
Also a women's rights activist, Bugaighis advocated against implementing a quota on the participation of women in Libyan politics, believing it would "reduce the chances of the right qualified women getting seats in parliament". She has called for greater legal protection of victims of domestic violence, access to abortion in cases of rape, and reform of the country's family law.

She is the sister of Wafa Bugaighis, the Libyan ambassador to the United States. Her cousin was Salwa Bughaighis, a Libyan human rights activist who was assassinated in 2014.

Honours
She is a distinguished visitor at the O’Neill Institute for National and Global Health Law at Georgetown Law. She regularly gives speeches at universities in the United States.

References

Libyan obstetricians
Libyan women activists
Year of birth missing (living people)
Place of birth missing (living people)
Living people
Libyan businesspeople
Libyan feminists
Women gynaecologists